The 2013 Detroit Tigers season was the team's 113th season. They finished 93–69, first place in the American League (AL) Central Division. During the season, the Tigers finished one game ahead of the second place Cleveland Indians. They became the first Tigers team to win three consecutive titles since the 1907, 1908 and 1909 clubs won three consecutive American League pennants. The Tigers defeated the Oakland Athletics in five games in the American League Division Series and advanced to the ALCS for the third straight season, the first time a Major League team has done so since the New York Yankees advanced to four straight from 1998 to 2001. They lost the American League Championship Series to the Boston Red Sox, four games to two. Manager Jim Leyland announced his retirement following the American League Championship Series.

Third baseman Miguel Cabrera was named the AL Most Valuable Player for the second consecutive year and starting pitcher Max Scherzer was named the AL Cy Young Award winner. Shortstop Jose Iglesias was runner-up to Wil Myers of the Tampa Bay Rays for the AL Rookie of the Year.

Preseason
At the conclusion of the 2012 season, the Tigers extended manager Jim Leyland's contract for one season. and announced that Gene Lamont was moved from third base coach to bench coach. Lamont says the move was primarily for health and mobility reasons. Tom Brookens moved from first base coach to third base coach and Rafael Belliard took over as first base coach. The Tigers also hired veteran third base coach Jeff Cox as a baserunning consultant.

On November 14, 2012, The Tigers signed free agent outfielder Torii Hunter to a two-year, $26 million contract. Hunter was the new starting right fielder for the season. The Tigers also signed free agent catcher Brayan Peña to a one-year contract.  They re-signed free agent pitcher Aníbal Sánchez to a five-year, $80 million contract.

The Tigers exercised the team options on infielder Jhonny Peralta and pitcher Octavio Dotel. They also avoided arbitration when they reached one-year deals with catcher Alex Avila, outfielders Brennan Boesch and Austin Jackson, and pitchers Phil Coke, Doug Fister, Rick Porcello and Max Scherzer. Previously-released Don Kelly was signed to a minor league contract.

On March 28, the Tigers extended ace starting pitcher Justin Verlander's contract for another five seasons (in addition to his old contract, which had two seasons remaining on it) with a $180 million deal, meaning he will is under contract until at least 2019, with an option for 2020.

The Tigers did not re-sign outfielder Delmon Young, backup catcher Gerald Laird, or closer José Valverde, releasing them to free agency. However, the Tigers brought back Valverde on April 4 when they signed him to a minor league contract, and called him back up to the major league club on April 24. He was again designated for assignment to the Toledo Mud Hens on June 21. The Tigers unconditionally released Valverde on August 7.

The Tigers released utility player Ryan Raburn, and non-tendered pitcher Daniel Schlereth's contract, making him a free agent. Matt Hoffman was outrighted to Triple-A Toledo, and the contract of left-handed relief pitcher Adam Wilk was sold to the NC Dinos of the Korea Baseball Organization.  They also released outfielder Brennan Boesch.

During the offseason, the Tigers traded starting pitcher Andrew Oliver to the Pittsburgh Pirates for catching prospect Ramón Cabrera. Cabrera was assigned to Class AAA Toledo.  The Tigers also acquired two Rule 5 draft picks through separate trades.  The club picked up second-baseman Jeff Kobernus from the Boston Red Sox in exchange for utility player Justin Henry, who had been assigned to Toledo.  The Tigers also received left-handed pitcher Kyle Lobstein from the New York Mets in exchange for cash considerations.  Kobernus was returned to the Nationals on March 23. The Tigers traded catcher Curt Casali to Tampa Bay in exchange for the rights to Rule 5 pitcher Kyle Lobstein, who was out-righted to Class AA Erie.

Regular season
On April 26, Aníbal Sánchez struck out 17 Atlanta Braves' batters, breaking a franchise record previously set by Tigers' left-hander Mickey Lolich in 1972.

On May 5, Justin Verlander took a no-hitter into the 7th inning against the Houston Astros before it was broken up by Carlos Peña. It would have been the third of his career.

On May 19, Miguel Cabrera hit three home runs in a game for the second time in his career.  He finished the game with four hits and five RBIs, but the Tigers still lost the game, 11–8, to the Texas Rangers.

On May 21, Max Scherzer retired 21 consecutive batters in a 5–1 victory over the Cleveland Indians. Scherzer allowed three baserunners in the first inning before retiring every hitter he faced over the next seven innings.

On May 24, in a game against the Minnesota Twins, Aníbal Sánchez was within two outs of his second career no-hitter, when it was broken up by Joe Mauer.

On June 1, the Tigers hit four home runs in the fourth inning of a game against the Baltimore Orioles. This was the first time the Tigers hit four homers in one inning since they last accomplished the feat on September 10, 1986. Víctor Martínez started the barrage with a solo shot down the right-field line; Jhonny Peralta followed with a long fly into the fourth row of the left-field bleachers before Alex Avila blasted one into the Orioles' bullpen. Miguel Cabrera would later join the fun with a grand slam, giving him 17 home runs and a Major league-leading 65 RBIs.

On June 20, Jhonny Peralta hit a walk-off two-run home run off closer Andrew Bailey to defeat the Boston Red Sox, 4–3. It was the team's first walk-off win of the season.

On June 28, after a 6–3 win against the Tampa Bay Rays, Max Scherzer became the first Tigers pitcher to ever start a season 12–0, surpassing the 11–0 start from George Mullin in 1909.

On July 3, after a  6–2 win over the Toronto Blue Jays, Max Scherzer became the first major league pitcher to start a season 13-0 since Roger Clemens in 1986.

The Tigers sent six players to the 2013 All-Star Game, giving them more representatives than any other major league team, and matching their most representatives since 1985. Miguel Cabrera was voted in as the starter at third base in the fan voting; Prince Fielder, Jhonny Peralta, Torii Hunter and Max Scherzer were selected as reserves in the player voting; Justin Verlander was added by manager Jim Leyland. The Tigers had a chance to send seven players to the All-Star Game this season, as Joaquín Benoit was one of the five finalists for the AL in the All-Star Final Vote, but Benoit was beaten out by pitcher Steve Delabar of the Toronto Blue Jays. On July 15, Scherzer was selected to start the game by his manager, Jim Leyland, who managed the AL squad this season.

On July 6, Torii Hunter fell a single shy of the cycle, hitting a triple, double and two-run home run to help the Tigers defeat the Cleveland Indians, 9–4.

On July 29, the Tigers traded outfield prospect Danry Vasquez and a player to be named later to the Houston Astros, in exchange for relief pitcher José Veras. To make room on the roster, pitcher Luke Putkonen was optioned to Triple-A Toledo.

On July 30, the Tigers traded outfielder Avisaíl García to the Chicago White Sox and pitcher Brayan Villarreal to the Boston Red Sox in a three-team deal to acquire infielder José Iglesias from the Red Sox.

On July 30, Alex Avila hit his first career grand slam against the Washington Nationals' ace Stephen Strasburg, leading the Tigers to a 5–1 victory.

On July 31, Torii Hunter fell a triple shy of the cycle, hitting a solo home run, single and double to help the Tigers defeat the Washington Nationals, 11–1.

On August 5, 2013, shortstop Jhonny Peralta was among 13 players suspended by Major League Baseball for his role in the Biogenesis performance-enhancing drug scandal. As a first-time offender of the league's drug policy, Peralta received a 50-game suspension.

On August 8, after a 10–3 win over the Cleveland Indians, Scherzer became the third pitcher in major league history to start a season 17–1, following Roger Clemens in 2001 and Don Newcombe in 1955.

On August 9, the Tigers' 12-game winning streak came to an end after an extra innings loss to the New York Yankees. The winning streak was tied for the second longest streak in club history.

On August 17, Miguel Cabrera hit a walk-off home run off Aaron Crow to defeat the Kansas City Royals, 6–5. This was Cabrera's major league leading thirteenth game-tying or go-ahead home run in the ninth inning or later in the last five seasons.

On August 18, Miguel Cabrera hit his 361st career home run, taking the number 77 spot on the career home runs list, tying Hall of Fame outfielder Joe DiMaggio. Cabrera became the third player since 1921 to have at least 40 home runs and 120 RBIs while batting .350 or better through 116 games, joining Hall of Fame members Babe Ruth and Jimmie Foxx.

On August 24, after a 3–0 win over the New York Mets, Scherzer became the third pitcher in major league history to start a season 19–1, following Roger Clemens in 2001 and Rube Marquard in 1912.

On August 25, with a win over the New York Mets, the Tigers became the first Major League team this year to have five pitchers with double-digit wins. The last time the Tigers had five pitchers (including starters and relievers) with double-digit wins was the 1984 World Series winning team, the last time the Tigers had five starting pitchers with double-digit wins was in 1949.

On September 6, the Tigers had a season high 26 hits in a 16–2 victory over the Kansas City Royals. The last time the Tigers had at least 26 hits in a game was on May 27, 2004, in a 17–7 victory over the Kansas City Royals. Oddly, the Tigers had lost their previous game to the Boston Red Sox by a 20-4 score. Thus, the Tigers became the first MLB team to lose a game by at least 14 runs and then win the next game by at least 14 runs since the 1922 St. Louis Browns.

On September 6, Omar Infante and Andy Dirks were both 5-for-5, the first time the Tigers had two players with five hits in the same game since 1917, when Hall of Famer Ty Cobb, Bobby Veach and Ossie Vitt all had five hits.

On September 20, after a 12–5 win over the Chicago White Sox, Scherzer became the first major league pitcher this year to reach 20 wins. Scherzer became the second Tiger's pitcher to reach 20 wins since Bill Gullickson in 1991, following Justin Verlander in 2011, and 45th in Tiger's history. Scherzer finished the regular season with 21 wins, the most in the major leagues.

On September 21, the Tigers defeated the Chicago White Sox, 7-6, after trailing 6-0 in the ninth inning. This marked the first time that a Tigers team won a game after trailing by at least six runs in the ninth since 1947, when they rallied from a 6–0 deficit for a 7–6 win over the Washington Senators.

The Detroit Tigers set the major league single-season strikeouts record with 1,428 strikeouts. The Tigers became just the third team in major league history to have three pitchers strike out 200-plus batters in a single season, following the 1969 Houston Astros and 1967 Minnesota Twins.

Miguel Cabrera finished the regular season with a .348 batting average, winning his third straight AL batting title. Cabrera became the first Tiger to win three consecutive batting titles since Ty Cobb from 1917 to 1919. With his 44 home runs, Cabrera became the third player in Tigers history to hit 40+ home runs in consecutive seasons, joining Hank Greenberg (1937–38) and Cecil Fielder (1990–91).

On November 12, Max Scherzer was named the American League Cy Young Award winner, receiving 28 of 30 first-place votes.  Scherzer went 21–3 during the season, and was the major leagues' only 20-game winner. He also posted a 2.90 ERA, league-leading 0.97 WHIP, and 240 strikeouts.

On November 14, Miguel Cabrera won his second straight AL Most Valuable Player award, on the strength of a league-leading .348 batting average, 44 home runs and 139 RBIs. Cabrera also led the major leagues in on-base percentage (.442), slugging percentage (.636) and OPS (1.078). He received 23 of 30 first-place votes. Miguel is only the third Tiger player to win the MVP award more than once, joining Hank Greenberg (1935, 1940) and Hal Newhouser (1944–45).

Postseason
On October 10, during Game 5 of the ALDS against the Oakland Athletics, Justin Verlander took a no-hitter into the seventh inning, before it was broken up by Yoenis Céspedes. Verlander finished with 10 strikeouts and one walk in a shutout to seal the series victory. In his career, Verlander has thrown 30 consecutive scoreless innings in the postseason against the Athletics, a major league record for a pitcher versus one team, surpassing Christy Mathewson's 28 scoreless innings against the Philadelphia Athletics from 1905–11.

On October 12, during Game 1 of the ALCS against the Boston Red Sox, the Tigers were within two outs of a combined no-hitter, before it was broken up by Daniel Nava. The only other time a no-hitter was broken up in the ninth inning in postseason history was during the 1947 World Series.

On October 12, during Game 1 of the ALCS against the Boston Red Sox, Aníbal Sánchez became the first pitcher in Detroit Tigers history to strike out four batters in one inning. This was possible because Shane Victorino initially struck out after Jacoby Ellsbury did the same, but the ball got away from catcher Alex Avila, and Victorino advanced to first on a wild pitch. Sánchez later struck out David Ortiz and Mike Napoli. Sánchez became the second player in Major League history to strike out four batters in one inning during the postseason, following Orval Overall in the 1908 World Series.

On October 15, during Game 3 of the ALCS against the Boston Red Sox, Justin Verlander tied a postseason record by striking out six consecutive batters. Verlander finished the game with 10 strikeouts, marking the sixth time he has had at least 10 strikeouts in a postseason game, and setting a postseason record.

The Detroit Tigers set a franchise record by going 23 consecutive innings without allowing a run. The streak began in Game 5 of the ALDS against the Oakland Athletics, and continued until the sixth inning of Game 2 of the ALCS against the Boston Red Sox. The previous franchise record, set in 2006 and matched in 2011, was 20 consecutive scoreless innings.

The Detroit Tigers starting rotation set a Major League record for the most strikeouts in a postseason series with 55 strikeouts in the American League Championship Series. The previous record was 51, set by the Arizona Diamondbacks during the 2001 World Series. The Tigers pitching staff finished with a total of 73 strikeouts in the ALCS, a postseason record.

Standings

American League Central

Game log

Regular season

|- bgcolor="#bbffbb"
| 1 || April 1 || @ Twins ||  W 4–2 || Verlander (1–0) || Worley (0–1) || Coke (1) || 38,282 || 1–0
|-  bgcolor="ffbbbb"
| 2 || April 3 || @ Twins || L 3–2 || Perkins (1–0) || Coke (0–1) ||  || 22,963 || 1–1
|- bgcolor="ffbbbb"
| 3 || April 4 || @ Twins || L 8–2 || Pelfrey (1–0) || Porcello (0–1) ||  || 24,752 || 1–2
|- bgcolor="#bbffbb"
| 4 || April 5 || Yankees || W 8–3 ||Fister (1–0)  || Nova (0–1)  || Smyly (1) ||  45,051|| 2–2
|- bgcolor="#bbffbb"
| 5 || April 6 || Yankees || W 8–4 || Scherzer (1–0) || Hughes (0–1) ||  || 42,453 || 3–2
|- bgcolor="ffbbbb"
| 6 || April 7 || Yankees || L 7–0 || Sabathia (1–1)  || Verlander (1–1)  || || 39,829 || 3–3
|- bgcolor="#bbffbb"
| 7 || April 9 || Blue Jays || W 7–3  || Sánchez (1–0) || Morrow (0–1) ||  ||28,979 || 4–3 
|- bgcolor="ffbbbb"
| 8 || April 10 || Blue Jays || L 8–6 || Loup (1–0) || Villarreal (0–1) || Janssen (2) || 29,631 || 4–4   
|- bgcolor="#bbffbb"
| 9 || April 11 || Blue Jays || W 11–1  || Fister (2–0) || Johnson (0–1) ||  || 28,781 ||  5–4 
|- bgcolor="ffbbbb"
| 10 || April 12 || @ Athletics || L 4–3 (12)  || Resop (1–0) || Villarreal (0–2) ||  || 21,377 ||  5–5 
|- bgcolor="#bbffbb"
| 11 || April 13 || @ Athletics || W 7–3  || Verlander (2–1) || Anderson (1–2) ||  ||35,067  || 6–5  
|- bgcolor="#bbffbb"
| 12 || April 14 || @ Athletics || W 10–1 || Sánchez (2–0) || Parker (0–2) ||  || 20,755 || 7–5  
|- bgcolor="#bbffbb"
| 13 || April 16 || @ Mariners || W 6–2  || Fister (3–0)  || Harang (0–1) ||  || 12,379 || 8–5
|- bgcolor="#bbffbb"
| 14 || April 17 || @ Mariners || W 2–1 (14) || Smyly (1–0) || Furbush (0–1) || Benoit (1) || 14,981  ||  9–5 
|- bgcolor="ffbbbb"
| 15 || April 18 || @ Mariners || L 2–0 || Capps (1–1) || Verlander (2–2) || Wilhelmsen (6) || 15,742 ||   9–6
|- bgcolor="ffbbbb"
| 16 || April 19 || @ Angels || L 8–1  || Hanson (2–1) || Sánchez (2–1) ||  || 39,023 || 9–7 
|- bgcolor="ffbbbb"
| 17 || April 20 || @ Angels || L 10–0  || Richards (1–0) || Porcello (0–2) ||  || 35,081 || 9–8
|- bgcolor="ffbbbb"
| 18 || April 21 || @ Angels || L 4–3 (13) || Williams (1–0) || Coke (0–2) ||  || 41,147 || 9–9 
|- bgcolor="bbbbbb" 
| -- || April 23 || Royals  ||colspan=6| Postponed (rain). Rescheduled to August 16.  
|- bgcolor="#bbffbb"
| 19 || April 24 || Royals || W 7–5 || Scherzer (2–0)  || Davis (2–1) || Valverde (1)  || 30,347 ||  10–9
|- bgcolor="ffbbbb"
| 20 || April 25 || Royals || L 8–3 (10) || Collins (1–0) || Coke (0–3)  ||  || 30,321 ||  10–10
|- bgcolor="bbffbb"
| 21 || April 26 || Braves  || W 10–0 || Sánchez (3–1) || Maholm (3–2) || || 35,161 || 11–10 
|- bgcolor="bbffbb"
| 22 || April 27 || Braves || W 7–4 || Porcello (1–2) || Medlen (1–3)  || Valverde (2) ||42,881  || 12–10 
|- bgcolor="bbffbb"
| 23 || April 28 || Braves || W 8–3 || Fister (4–0) || Minor (3–2) ||  || 33,469 ||  13–10
|- bgcolor="bbffbb"
| 24 || April 29 || Twins || W 4–3 || Scherzer (3–0) || Pelfrey (2–3) || Benoit (2) ||29,878  ||  14–10
|- bgcolor="bbffbb"
| 25 || April 30 || Twins || W 6–1 || Verlander (3–2) || Worley (0–4)  ||  || 31,748 || 15–10 
|- bgcolor="

|- bgcolor="ffbbbb"
| 26 || May 1 || Twins || L 6–2 || Diamond (2–2) || Sánchez (3–2) ||  || 36,028 || 15–11
|- bgcolor="bbffbb"
| 27 || May 2 || @ Astros  || W 7–3 (14) || Putkonen (1–0)  || Keuchel (0–1) ||  || 16,624 || 16–11 
|- bgcolor="bbffbb"
| 28 || May 3 || @ Astros || W 4–3 || Smyly (2–0) || Veras (0–2)  || Valverde (3) || 16,719  || 17–11
|- bgcolor="bbffbb"
| 29 || May 4 || @ Astros  || W 17–2 || Scherzer (4–0) || Harrell (3–3) ||  || 21,266  || 18–11 
|- bgcolor="bbffbb"
| 30 || May 5 || @ Astros  || W 9–0 || Verlander (4–2) || Humber (0–7) ||  || 23,228  ||  19–11 
|- bgcolor="bbbbbb" 
| – || May 7 || @ Nationals ||colspan=6| Postponed (rain). Rescheduled to May 9.   
|- bgcolor="ffbbbb"
| 31 || May 8 || @ Nationals || L 3–1  || Zimmermann (6–1) || Sánchez (3–3) || Soriano (11) || 34,893  ||  19–12
|- bgcolor="ffbbbb"
| 32 || May 9 || @ Nationals || L 5–4 || Haren (4–3) || Fister (4–1) || Soriano (12) || 28,742 ||  19–13
|- bgcolor="bbffbb"
| 33 || May 10 || Indians || W 10–4 || Scherzer (5–0) || Kluber (2–2) ||  || 37,547 || 20–13    
|- bgcolor="ffbbbb"
| 34 || May 11 || Indians || L 7–6 || Jiménez (3–2)  || Verlander (4–3) || Perez (6) || 41,438 ||  20–14  
|- bgcolor="ffbbbb"
| 35 || May 12 || Indians || L 4–3 (10) || Smith (1–0) || Downs (0–1)  || Allen (1) || 35,260  ||   20–15
|- bgcolor="bbffbb"
| 36 || May 13 || Astros || W 7–2 || Sánchez (4–3) || Norris (4–4) ||  || 31,161 || 21–15   
|- bgcolor="bbffbb"
| 37 || May 14 || Astros || W 6–2  || Fister (5–1) || Harrell (3–4) || || 34,542  ||  22–15 
|- bgcolor="ffbbbb"
| 38 || May 15 || Astros || L 7–5 || Ambriz (1–2) || Alburquerque (0–1) || Veras (5) || 40,315 ||   22–16
|- bgcolor="ffbbbb"
| 39 || May 16 || @ Rangers || L 10–4  || Darvish (7–1) || Verlander (4–4) ||  || 39,778 ||  22–17  
|- bgcolor="bbffbb"
| 40 || May 17 || @ Rangers || W 2–1 || Porcello (2–2)  || Tepesch (3–4) || Valverde (4) || 42,778 ||  23–17 
|- bgcolor="ffbbbb"
| 41 || May 18 || @ Rangers || L 7–2 || Grimm (3–3) || Sánchez (4–4) ||  || 46,782 ||  23–18 
|- bgcolor="ffbbbb"
| 42 || May 19 || @ Rangers || L 11–8  || Ross (2–0) || Ortega (0–1) || Nathan (13)  || 39,638 || 23–19 
|- bgcolor="bbffbb"
| 43 || May 21 || @ Indians || W 5–1 || Scherzer (6–0) || Kluber (3–3) ||  || 17,374 ||  24–19
|- bgcolor="bbffbb"
| 44 || May 22 || @ Indians || W 11–7 || Verlander (5–4) || Jiménez (3–3) ||  || 16,562 || 25–19 
|- bgcolor="bbffbb"
| 45 || May 23 || Twins || W 7–6 || Benoit (1–0) || Burton (0–2) || Valverde (5) || 32,804 || 26–19 
|- bgcolor="bbffbb"
| 46 || May 24 || Twins || W 6–0 || Sánchez (5–4) || Deduno (0–1) ||  || 39,789 || 27–19
|- bgcolor="ffbbbb"
| 47 || May 25 || Twins || L 3–2 || Walters (1–0) || Fister (5–2) || Perkins (9) || 41,927 || 27–20 
|- bgcolor="bbffbb"
| 48 || May 26 || Twins || W 6–1 || Scherzer (7–0) || Pelfrey (3–5) ||  || 42,394 || 28–20 
|- bgcolor="bbffbb"
| 49 || May 27 || Pirates || W 6–5 || Verlander (6–4) || Liriano (3–1) || Valverde (6) || 41,416 || 29–20  
|- bgcolor="ffbbbb"
| 50 || May 28 || Pirates || L 1–0 (11) || Melancon (1–0) || Ortega (0–2) || Grilli (21) || 33,473 || 29–21 
|- bgcolor="ffbbbb"
| 51 || May 29 || @ Pirates || L 5–3 || Morris (2–2) || Sánchez (5–5) || Grilli (22) || 19,980 ||  29–22
|- bgcolor="ffbbbb"
| 52 || May 30 || @ Pirates || L 1–0 || Morris (3–2) || Putkonen (1–1) ||  || 20,834 || 29–23
|- bgcolor="ffbbbb"
| 53 || May 31 || @ Orioles || L 7–5 || O'Day (3–0) || Valverde (0–1) || || 46,429 || 29–24
|-

|- bgcolor="bbffbb"
| 54 || June 1 ||  @ Orioles || W 10–3 || Verlander (7–4) || Hammel (7–3) ||  || 38,945 || 30–24
|- bgcolor="ffbbbb"
| 55 || June 2 ||  @ Orioles || L 4–2 || Matusz (2–0) || Porcello (2–3) || Johnson (18) || 39,182 ||  30–25
|- bgcolor="bbffbb"
| 56 || June 4 || Rays || W 10–1 || Sánchez (6–5) || Moore (8–1) ||  || 30,569 ||  31–25
|- bgcolor="ffbbbb"
| 57 || June 5 || Rays || L 3–0 || Peralta (1–2) || Fister (5–3) || Rodney (12) || 30,005 ||  31–26
|- bgcolor="bbffbb"
| 58 || June 6 || Rays || W 5–2 || Scherzer (8–0) || Hernández (3–6) || Valverde (7) || 36,168 ||  32–26
|- bgcolor="bbffbb"
| 59 || June 7 || Indians || W 7–5 || Verlander (8–4) || Jiménez (4–4) ||  || 39,008 ||  33–26
|- bgcolor="bbffbb"
| 60 || June 8 || Indians || W 6–4 || Porcello (3–3) || Carrasco (0–2)  || Valverde (8) || 41,691 || 34–26 
|- bgcolor="bbffbb"
| 61 || June 9 || Indians || W 4–1 || Álvarez (1–0) || Masterson (8–5) || Benoit (3) || 41,262 ||  35–26
|- bgcolor="ffbbbb"
| 62 || June 10 || @ Royals || L 3–2 || Guthrie (7–3) || Fister (5–4) || Holland (13) || 17,653 ||  35–27
|- bgcolor="bbffbb"
| 63 || June 11 || @ Royals || W 3–2 || Scherzer (9–0) || Crow (2–2) || Valverde (9) || 16,493 || 36–27
|- bgcolor="ffbbbb"
| 64 || June 12 || @ Royals || L 3-2 (10) || Holland (2-1) || Coke (0-4) || || 24,564 || 36–28 
|- bgcolor="bbffbb"
| 65 || June 14 || @ Twins || W 4–0 || Porcello (4–3) || Diamond (4–6) ||  || 29,571  || 37–28
|- bgcolor="ffbbbb"
| 66 || June 15 || @ Twins || L 6–3 || Deduno (3–1) || Downs (0–2) || Perkins (16) || 35,071 || 37–29
|- bgcolor="bbffbb"
| 67 || June 16 || @ Twins || W 5–2 || Fister (6–4) || Walters (2–2) || Benoit (4) || 39,317 || 38–29 
|- bgcolor="bbffbb"
| 68 || June 17 || Orioles || W 5–1 || Scherzer (10–0) || Arrieta (1–2) || Smyly (2) || 32,525 || 39–29
|- bgcolor="ffbbbb"
| 69 || June 18 || Orioles || L 5–2 || Britton (1–1) || Verlander (8–5) || Johnson (26) || 34,706 || 39–30
|- bgcolor="ffbbbb"
| 70 || June 19 || Orioles || L 13–3 || Tillman (8–2) || Porcello (4–4) ||  || 38,574 || 39–31
|- bgcolor="bbffbb"
| 71 || June 20 || Red Sox || W 4–3 || Smyly (3–0) || Bailey (3–1) ||  || 36,939 || 40–31 
|- bgcolor="ffbbbb"
| 72 || June 21 || Red Sox || L 10–6 || Lester (7–4) || Fister (6–5) ||  || 41,126 || 40–32
|- bgcolor="bbffbb"
| 73 || June 22 || Red Sox || W 10–3 || Scherzer (11–0) || Webster (0–2) ||  || 42,508 || 41–32 
|- bgcolor="bbffbb"
| 74 || June 23 || Red Sox || W 7–5 || Benoit (2–0) || Miller (0–2) ||  || 41,507 || 42–32  
|- bgcolor="ffbbbb"
| 75 || June 25 || Angels || L 14–8 || Wilson (7–5) || Porcello (4–5) ||  || 34,204 || 42–33 
|- bgcolor="ffbbbb"
| 76 || June 26 || Angels || L 7–4  || De La Rosa (2–1)  || Álvarez (1–1) || Frieri (18) || 35,635 || 42–34
|- bgcolor="ffbbbb"
| 77 || June 27 || Angels || L 3–1 (10) || Jepsen (1–2) || Coke (0–5) || Frieri (19) || 39,496 || 42–35 
|- bgcolor="bbffbb"
| 78 || June 28 || @ Rays || W 6–3 || Scherzer (12–0) || Colomé (1–1) || Benoit (5) || 17,645 || 43–35  
|- bgcolor="ffbbbb"
| 79 || June 29 || @ Rays || L 4–3 || Rodney (3–2) || Rondon (0–1) ||  || 23,809 || 43–36 
|- bgcolor="ffbbbb"
| 80 || June 30 || @ Rays || L 3–1 || Hellickson (7–3) || Porcello (4–6)  || Rodney (17) || 23,427 || 43–37 
|- bgcolor="

|- bgcolor="ffbbbb"
| 81 || July 1 ||@ Blue Jays || L 8–3 || Dickey (8–8) || Álvarez (1–2) ||  || 45,766 || 43–38
|- bgcolor="bbffbb"
| 82 || July 2 || @ Blue Jays || W 7–6 || Alburquerque (1–1) || Wagner (1–3) || Benoit (6) || 27,189 || 44–38 
|- bgcolor="bbffbb"
| 83 || July 3 || @ Blue Jays || W 6–2 || Scherzer (13–0) || Johnson (1–3) ||  || 28,958 || 45–38 
|- bgcolor="bbffbb"
| 84 || July 4 || @ Blue Jays || W 11–1 || Verlander (9–5) || Rogers (3–4) ||  || 35,978 || 46–38 
|- bgcolor="bbffbb"
| 85 || July 5 || @ Indians || W 7–0 || Porcello (5–6) || Masterson (10–7) ||  || 40,167  || 47–38 
|- bgcolor="bbffbb"
| 86 || July 6 || @ Indians || W 9–4 || Sánchez (6–5) || Carrasco (0–4) ||  || 28,054 || 48–38 
|- bgcolor="ffbbbb"
| 87 || July 7 || @ Indians || L 9–6 || Allen (4–1) || Alburquerque (1–2) || Perez (9) || 20,503 || 48–39
|- bgcolor="bbffbb"
| 88 || July 8 || @ Indians || W 4–2 (10) || Smyly (4–0) || Albers (2–1) || Benoit (7) || 23,640 || 49–39 
|- bgcolor="ffbbbb"
| 89 || July 9 || White Sox || L 11–4 || Quintana (4–2) || Verlander (9–6) ||  || 37,113 || 49–40 
|- bgcolor="bbffbb"
| 90 || July 10 || White Sox || W 8–5 || Porcello (6–6) || Axelrod (3–6) || Benoit (8) || 39,085 || 50–40  
|- bgcolor="ffbbbb"
| 91 || July 11 || White Sox || L 6–3 || Sale (6–8) || Sánchez (7–6) || Reed (23) || 40,444 || 50–41 
|- bgcolor="bbffbb"
| 92 || July 12 || Rangers || W 7–2 || Fister (7–5) || Grimm (7–7) ||  || 41,686 || 51–41 
|- bgcolor="ffbbbb"
| 93 || July 13 || Rangers || L 7–1 || Holland (8-4) || Scherzer (13–1) ||  || 44,061 || 51–42 
|- bgcolor="bbffbb"
| 94 || July 14 || Rangers || W 5–0 || Verlander (10–6) || Pérez (3–2) ||  || 41,617 || 52–42
|- bgcolor="ffbbbb"
| 95 || July 19 || @ Royals || L 1–0 || Santana (6–6) || Sánchez (7–7) || Holland (23) || 35,000 || 52–43 
|- bgcolor="ffbbbb"
| 96 || July 20 || @ Royals || L 6–5 || Guthrie (9–7) || Verlander (10–7) || Holland (24) || 30,116 || 52–44
|- bgcolor="bbffbb"
| 97 || July 21 || @ Royals || W 4–1 || Fister (8–5) || Shields (4–7) || Benoit (9) || 20,513 || 53–44 
|- bgcolor="bbffbb"
| 98 || July 22 || @ White Sox || W 7–3 || Scherzer (14–1) || Sale (6–9) ||  || 23,195 || 54–44 
|- bgcolor="bbffbb"
| 99 || July 23 || @ White Sox || W 6–2 || Porcello (7–6) || Santiago (3–6) ||  || 25,919 || 55–44 
|- bgcolor="bbffbb"
| 100 || July 24 || @ White Sox || W 6–2 || Sánchez (8–7) || Danks (2–8) ||  || 26,793 || 56–44 
|- bgcolor="ffbbbb"
| 101 || July 25 || @ White Sox || L 7–4 || Peavy (8–4) || Verlander (10–8) || Reed (26) || 30,348 || 56–45  
|- bgcolor="bbffbb"
| 102 || July 26 || Phillies || W 2–1 || Fister (9–5) || Hamels (4–13) || Benoit (10) || 42,317 || 57–45
|- bgcolor="bbffbb"
| 103 || July 27 || Phillies || W 10–0 || Scherzer (15–1) || Valdés (1–1) ||  || 41,970 || 58–45 
|- bgcolor="bbffbb"
| 104 || July 28 || Phillies || W 12–4 || Porcello (8–6) || Diekman (0–1) ||  || 41,326 || 59–45 
|- bgcolor="bbffbb"
| 105 || July 30 || Nationals || W 5–1 || Sánchez (9–7) || Strasburg (5–9) ||  || 41,880 || 60–45 
|- bgcolor="bbffbb"
| 106 || July 31 || Nationals || W 11–1 || Verlander (11–8) || Gonzalez (7–4) ||  || 40,894 || 61–45 
|-

|- bgcolor="bbffbb"
| 107 || August 2 || White Sox || W 2–1 || Fister (10–5) || Santiago (3–7) || Benoit (11) || 41,109 || 62–45 
|- bgcolor="bbffbb"
| 108 || August 3 || White Sox || W 3–0 || Scherzer (16–1) || Danks (2–9) || Benoit (12) || 43,906 || 63–45  
|- bgcolor="bbffbb"
| 109 || August 4 || White Sox || W 3–2 (12) || Rondón (1–1) || Axelrod (3–8) ||  || 42,513 || 64–45 
|- bgcolor="bbffbb"
| 110 || August 5 || @ Indians || W 4–2 || Alburquerque (2–2) || Perez (4–2) || Benoit (13) || 24,381 || 65–45
|- bgcolor="bbffbb"
| 111 || August 6 || @ Indians || W 5–1 || Verlander (12–8) || Masterson (13–8) ||  || 24,676 || 66–45 
|- bgcolor="bbffbb"
| 112 || August 7 || @ Indians || W 6–5 (14) || Bonderman (2–3) || Shaw (2–3) || Benoit (14) || 20,169 || 67–45  
|- bgcolor="bbffbb"
| 113 || August 8 || @ Indians || W 10–3 || Scherzer (17–1) || McAllister (4–7) ||  || 25,131 || 68–45 
|- bgcolor="ffbbbb"
| 114 || August 9 || @ Yankees || L 4–3 (10) || Kelley (4–1) || Alburquerque (2–3) ||  || 46,545 || 68–46 
|- bgcolor="bbffbb"
| 115 || August 10 || @ Yankees || W 9–3 || Sánchez (10–7) || Hughes (4–11) ||  || 45,728 || 69–46 
|- bgcolor="ffbbbb"
| 116 || August 11 || @ Yankees || L 5–4 || Rivera (3–2) || Veras (0–5) ||  || 42,439 || 69–47 
|- bgcolor="ffbbbb"
| 117 || August 12 || @ White Sox || L 6–2 || Sale (8–11) || Fister (10–6) ||  || 19,590 || 69–48 
|- bgcolor="ffbbbb"
| 118 || August 13 || @ White Sox || L 4–3 (11)  || Reed (5–1) || Bonderman (2–4) ||  || 22,292 || 69–49
|- bgcolor="bbffbb"
| 119 || August 14 || @ White Sox || W 6–4 || Porcello (9–6) || Danks (2–10) || Benoit (15) || 20,058 || 70–49 
|- bgcolor="bbffbb"
| 120 || August 15 || Royals || W 4–1 || Sánchez (11–7) || Guthrie (12–9) || Benoit (16) || 37,872 || 71–49 
|- bgcolor="ffbbbb"
| 121 || August 16 || Royals || L 2–1 || Duffy (1–0) || Verlander (12–9) || Holland (33) || 38,714 || 71–50 
|- bgcolor="ffbbbb"
| 122 || August 16 || Royals || L 3–0 || Shields (8–8) || Álvarez (1–3) || Holland (34) || 40,980 || 71–51 
|- bgcolor="bbffbb"
| 123 || August 17 || Royals || W 6–5 || Benoit (3–0) || Crow (7–4) ||  || 41,850 || 72–51
|- bgcolor="bbffbb"
| 124 || August 18 || Royals || W 6–3 || Scherzer (18–1) || Chen (5–1) ||  || 41,740 || 73–51 
|- bgcolor="ffbbbb"
| 125 || August 20 || Twins ||  L 6–3 || Pelfrey (5–10) || Porcello (9–7) || Perkins (29) || 37,964 || 73–52 
|- bgcolor="bbffbb"
| 126 || August 21 || Twins || W 7–1 || Smyly (5–0) || Correia (8–10) || Veras (20) || 38,092 || 74–52 
|- bgcolor="ffbbbb"
| 127 || August 22 || Twins || L 7–6 || Fien (3–2) || Rondón (1–2) || Perkins (30) || 39,653 || 74–53 
|- bgcolor="bbffbb"
| 128 || August 23 || @ Mets || W 6–1 || Fister (11–6) || Matsuzaka (0–1) ||  || 37,023 || 75–53 
|- bgcolor="bbffbb"
| 129 || August 24 || @ Mets || W 3–0 || Scherzer (19–1) || Harvey (9–5) || Benoit (17) || 35,636 ||  76–53
|- bgcolor="bbffbb"
| 130 || August 25 || @ Mets || W 11–3 || Porcello (10–7) || Gee (9–9) ||  || 32,084 || 77–53 
|- bgcolor="ffbbbb"
| 131 || August 26 || Athletics || L 8–6 || Griffin (11–9) || Álvarez (1–4) || Balfour (33) || 34,778 || 77–54 
|- bgcolor="ffbbbb"
| 132 || August 27 || Athletics || L 6–3 (6) || Milone (10–9) || Verlander (12–10) ||  || 34,356 || 77–55
|- bgcolor="ffbbbb"
| 133 || August 28 || Athletics || L 14–4 || Straily (7–7) || Fister (11–7) || Anderson (1) || 31,973 || 77–56
|- bgcolor="bbffbb"
| 134 || August 29 || Athletics || W 7–6 || Benoit (4–0) || Balfour (0–3) ||  || 39,212 || 78–56 
|- bgcolor="bbffbb"
| 135 || August 30 || Indians || W 7–2 (7) || Porcello (11–7) || McAllister (7–8) || Rondón (1) || 37,067 || 79–56 
|- bgcolor="bbffbb"
| 136 || August 31 || Indians || W 10–5 || Sánchez (12–7) || Kazmir (7–7) ||  || 41,272 || 80–56 
|-

|- bgcolor="ffbbbb"
| 137 || September 1 || Indians || L 4–0 || Smith (6–2) || Benoit (4–1) ||  || 41,557 || 80–57 
|- bgcolor="bbffbb"
| 138 || September 2 || @ Red Sox || W 3–0 || Fister (12–7) || Lackey (8–12) || Veras (21) || 36,188 || 81–57 
|- bgcolor="ffbbbb"
| 139 || September 3 || @ Red Sox || L 2–1 || Lester (13–8) || Scherzer (19–2) || Uehara (17) || 32,071 || 81–58
|- bgcolor="ffbbbb"
| 140 || September 4 || @ Red Sox || L 20–4 || Dempster (8–9) || Porcello (11–8) ||  || 33,720 || 81–59 
|- bgcolor="bbffbb"
| 141 || September 6 || @ Royals || W 16–2 || Sánchez (13–7) || Shields (10–9) || || 21,358 || 82–59  
|- bgcolor="ffbbbb"
| 142 || September 7 || @ Royals || L 4–3 || Davis (7–10) || Verlander (12–11) || Holland (39) || 20,402 || 82–60 
|- bgcolor="ffbbbb"
| 143 || September 8 || @ Royals || L 5–2 || Chen (7–2) || Fister (12–8) || Holland (40) || 16,774 || 82–61 
|- bgcolor="ffbbbb"
| 144 || September 9 || @ White Sox || L 5–1 || Sale (11–12) || Scherzer (19–3) ||  || 17,193 || 82–62 
|- bgcolor="bbffbb"
| 145 || September 10 || @ White Sox || W 9–1 || Porcello (12–8) || Johnson (0–2) ||  || 19,172 || 83–62
|- bgcolor="bbffbb"
| 146 || September 11 || @ White Sox || W 1–0 || Sánchez (14–7) || Lindstrom (2–4) || Benoit (18) || 15,799 || 84–62 
|- bgcolor="bbffbb"
| 147 || September 13 || Royals || W 6–3 || Verlander (13–11) || Chen (7–3) || Benoit (19) || 40,389 || 85–62 
|- bgcolor="ffbbbb"
| 148 || September 14 || Royals || L 1–0 || Santana (9–9) || Fister (12–9) || Holland (43) || 41,841 || 85–63 
|- bgcolor="bbffbb"
| 149 || September 15 || Royals || W 3–2 || Smyly (6–0) || Guthrie (14–11) || Benoit (20) || 40,491 || 86–63  
|- bgcolor="bbffbb"
| 150 || September 16 || Mariners || W 4–2 || Porcello (13–8) || Saunders (11–15) || Benoit (21) || 34,063 || 87–63 
|- bgcolor="bbffbb"
| 151 || September 17 || Mariners || W 6–2 || Alburquerque (3–3) || Medina (4–6) ||  || 39,076 || 88–63  
|- bgcolor="ffbbbb"
| 152 || September 18 || Mariners || L 8–0 || Iwakuma (13–6) || Verlander (13–12) ||  || 36,395 || 88–64 
|- bgcolor="bbffbb"
| 153 || September 19 || Mariners || W 5–4 || Fister (13–9) || Furbush (2–6) || Benoit (22) || 38,341 || 89–64 
|- bgcolor="bbffbb"
| 154 || September 20 || White Sox || W 12–5 || Scherzer (20–3) || Axelrod (4–10) ||  || 39,643 || 90–64 
|- bgcolor="bbffbb"
| 155 || September 21 || White Sox || W 7–6 (12) || Alburquerque (4–3) || Petricka (1–1) ||  || 41,772 || 91–64 
|- bgcolor="ffbbbb"
| 156 || September 22 || White Sox || L 6–3 || Johnson (2–2) || Sánchez (14–8) ||  || 41,749 || 91–65 
|- bgcolor="ffbbbb"
| 157 || September 23 || @ Twins || L 4–3 (11) || Swarzak (3–2) || Putkonen (1–1) ||  || 24,647 || 91–66 
|- bgcolor="bbffbb"
| 158 || September 24 || @ Twins || W 4–2 || Fister (14–9) || Diamond (6–12) || Benoit (23) || 25,541 || 92–66 
|- bgcolor="bbffbb"
| 159 || September 25 || @ Twins || W 1–0 || Scherzer (21–3) || Correia (9–13) || Benoit (24) || 26,517 || 93–66 
|- bgcolor="ffbbbb"
| 160 || September 27 || @ Marlins || L 3–2 || Koehler (5–10) || Álvarez (1–5) || Cishek (34) || 26,992 || 93–67 
|- bgcolor="ffbbbb"
| 161 || September 28 || @ Marlins || L 2–1 (10) || Cishek (4–6) || Reed (0–1) ||  || 28,750 || 93–68 
|- bgcolor="ffbbbb"
| 162 || September 29|| @ Marlins || L 1–0 || Álvarez (5–6) || Putkonen (1–3) ||  || 28,315 || 93–69 
|-

Postseason

American League Division Series

|- bgcolor="#bbffbb"
| 1 || October 4  || @ Athletics || W 3–2 || Scherzer (1–0) || Colón (0–1) || Benoit (1) || 48,401 || 1–0
|- bgcolor="ffbbbb"
| 2 || October 5  || @ Athletics || L 1–0 || Balfour (1–0) || Alburquerque (0–1) || || 48,292 || 1–1
|- bgcolor="ffbbbb"
| 3 || October 7  || Athletics || L 6–3 || Parker (1–0) || Sánchez (0–1) || Balfour (1) || 43,973 || 1–2
|- bgcolor="#bbffbb"
| 4 || October 8  || Athletics || W 8–6 || Scherzer (2–0) || Doolittle (0–1) || || 43,958 || 2–2
|- bgcolor="#bbffbb"
| 5 || October 10  || @ Athletics || W 3–0 || Verlander (1–0) || Gray (0–1) || Benoit (2) || 46,959 || 3–2
|- bgcolor="

American League Championship Series

|- bgcolor="#bbffbb"
| 1 || October 12 || @ Red Sox || W 1–0 || Sánchez (1–0) || Lester (0–1) || Benoit (1) || 38,210 || 1–0
|- bgcolor="ffbbbb"
| 2 || October 13 || @ Red Sox || L 6–5 || Uehara (1–0) || Porcello (0–1) || || 38,029 || 1–1
|- bgcolor="ffbbbb"
| 3 || October 15 || Red Sox || L 1–0 || Lackey (1–0) || Verlander (0–1) || Uehara (1) || 42,327 || 1–2
|- bgcolor="#bbffbb"
| 4 || October 16 || Red Sox || W 7–3 || Fister (1–0) || Peavy (0–1) || || 42,765 || 2–2
|- bgcolor="ffbbbb"
| 5 || October 17 || Red Sox || L 4–3 || Lester (1–1) || Sánchez (1–1) || Uehara (2) || 42,669 || 2–3
|- bgcolor="ffbbbb"
| 6 || October 19 || @ Red Sox || L 5–2 || Tazawa (1–0) || Scherzer (0–1) || Uehara (3) || 38,823 || 2–4
|- bgcolor=

Detailed records

Roster

Player stats

Batting
Note: G = Games played; AB = At bats; R = Runs scored; H = Hits; 2B = Doubles; 3B = Triples; HR = Home runs; RBI = Runs batted in; AVG = Batting average; SB = Stolen bases

+Totals with Tigers only.

Pitching

Starters
Note: W = Wins; L = Losses; ERA = Earned run average; G = Games pitched; GS = Games started; SV = Saves; IP = Innings pitched; R = Runs allowed; ER = Earned runs allowed; BB = Walks allowed; K = Strikeouts

Bullpen
Note: W = Wins; L = Losses; ERA = Earned run average; G = Games pitched; GS = Games started; SV = Saves; IP = Innings pitched; R = Runs allowed; ER = Earned runs allowed; BB = Walks allowed; K = Strikeouts

+Totals with Tigers only.

Farm system

References

External links

Detroit Tigers official site
2013 Detroit Tigers at Baseball Reference

Detroit Tigers seasons
Detroit Tigers
Detroit Tigers
American League Central champion seasons
2013 in Detroit